Dowsing is an American emo band  from Chicago.

History
Dowsing began in 2011 with the release of an EP titled All I Could Find Was You. They followed that release with a 7-inch split with Parker via Count Your Lucky Stars.

In 2012, Dowsing released their first studio album titled It's Still Pretty Terrible via Count Your Lucky Stars. The following year they released their second studio album titled I Don't Even Care Anymore. In 2013, Soft Speak Records released a split with Dowsing, Haverford, Run, Forever, and Captain, We're Sinking.

In May 2014, Dowsing released a 7-inch split with Annabel via Count Your Lucky Stars.

In July 2015, Count Your Lucky Stars Records released a 7-inch split with  The Cardboard Swords, Dowsing, Long Knives, and Sinai Vessel.

On April 29, 2016, Dowsing released their third studio album entitled Okay via Asian Man Records.

In 2016, Dowsing featured a demo version of "Feeling Better" on "Forever Beautiful, A compilation of love for Orlando" after the Pulse Nightclub shooting.

Band members
Current
Erik Hunter Czaja - Vocals/Guitar
Michael "Mikey" Crotty - Guitar/Vocals
Michael "Mike P" Politowicz - Bass/Vocals
Ian Paine-Jesam - Drums/Vocals
Sean Neumann - Band Manager/Principal songwriter
Former
Will Lange - Drums
Marcus Nuccio - Drums 
Delia Hornik - Keyboard 
Joeseph "Gooey Fame" Dane - Bass

Discography
Studio albums
It's Still Pretty Terrible (2012, Count Your Lucky Stars)
I Don't Even Care Anymore (2013, Count Your Lucky Stars)
Okay (2016, Asian Man)
EPs and splits
All I Could Find Was You (2011, Count Your Lucky Stars)
Dowsing / Parker (2012, Count Your Lucky Stars)
Dowsing / Haverford / Run Forever* / Captain, We're Sinking - Stay Sweet Split (2013, Soft Speak)
Annabel / Dowsing (2014, Count Your Lucky Stars)
Dowsing / The Cardboard Swords / Long Knives / Sinai Vessel - Dowsing / The Cardboard Swords / Long Knives / Sinai Vessel (2015, Count Your Lucky Stars)

References

Musical groups established in 2011
Musical groups from Chicago
2011 establishments in Illinois
American emo musical groups
Indie rock musical groups from Illinois
Count Your Lucky Stars Records artists